The Capitol Skyline Hotel was a hotel located near the United States Capitol in Capitol Hill, Washington, D.C. Designed by Morris Lapidus, the hotel opened in November 1962 as the Skyline Inn, and was once part of the Best Western chain.  The hotel closed during the COVID-19 pandemic and was used to shelter medically vulnerable residents.

References

External links
 

1962 establishments in Washington, D.C.
Capitol Hill
Defunct hotels in the United States
Hotel buildings completed in 1962
Hotels in Washington, D.C.
Morris Lapidus buildings